The secretary of state of Maine is a constitutional officer in the U.S. state of Maine and serves as the head of the Maine Department of State. The Secretary of State performs duties of both a legislative branch as well as an executive branch officer. The role oversees areas that include motor vehicle licensing, state identification, record keeping, and corporate chartering.

The secretary of state is elected biannually by ballot of members of both houses of the Maine Legislature assembled together, identical in procedure to its neighbor, New Hampshire. The position is elected at the start of the first session of the Maine Legislature, which also sits for a two-year term, concurrent with the other constitutional officers of Maine.

The incumbent secretary of state is Shenna Bellows, who took office on  January 4, 2021.

Duties 
The secretary of state oversees three distinct areas within their department. These coincide with the three bureaus under their aegis: the Maine Bureau of Corporations, Elections and Commissions, Maine State Archives and Maine Bureau of Motor Vehicles.

Corporations, elections, and commissions 
The secretary of state has oversight over the conduct of elections, petition filing, and state-wide ballot initiatives. They are responsible for applying campaign conduct law against candidates for office. The secretary reviews petitions to verify authenticity of signatures for ballot initiatives under the Maine Constitution.

The secretary of state also oversees and applies the state's corporation law. Corporations seeking to be chartered in Maine do so through the secretary's office. The secretary has oversight over Maine's commercial law and application of the Uniform Commercial Code.

The secretary's office appoints and regulates the state's notaries public.

State archives 
The secretary maintains laws passed in the state and all records of the legislature, state agencies, election returns, vital statistics, county court rulings, and Supreme Judicial Court rulings and proceedings.

Motor vehicles 
The secretary oversees the Maine Bureau of Motor Vehicles and is thus responsible for overseeing identification, motor vehicle registration, vehicle inspections, and other forms of licensing.

List of secretaries of state
The following officials have served as secretary of state of Maine:

See also
 List of company registers

References